Stéphan Baziel Martens (born 15 December 1931) is a Belgian cyclist. He competed in the men's sprint event at the 1952 Summer Olympics.

References

External links
 

1931 births
Possibly living people
Belgian male cyclists
Olympic cyclists of Belgium
Cyclists at the 1952 Summer Olympics
People from Deinze
Cyclists from East Flanders